Vik is a village in Grimstad municipality in Agder county, Norway. The village is located at the northern end of the Kilen bay that flows past the town of Grimstad. The village sits at the junction of Norwegian County Road 420 and Norwegian County Road 407 on the south side of the European route E18 highway. The village was the administrative centre of the old municipality of Fjære.

References

Villages in Agder
Grimstad